Metalobosia diaxantha is a moth of the subfamily Arctiinae. It was described by George Hampson in 1914. It is found in Amazonas, Brazil.

References

 

Lithosiini
Moths described in 1914